is the 62nd single of the Japanese girl group Morning Musume. It was released on November 23, 2016.

Release details
The single was released in six versions: 3 CD-only regular editions and 3 CD+DVD limited editions. The first press regular editions come with a random trading card of 12 kinds depending on the jacket, for a total of 36 cards. The limited editions instead include an event lottery serial number card.

Charts

Members at time of single 
 9th generation: Mizuki Fukumura, Erina Ikuta
 10th generation: Haruna Iikubo, Ayumi Ishida, Masaki Sato, Haruka Kudo
 11th generation: Sakura Oda
 12th generation: Haruna Ogata, Miki Nonaka, Maria Makino, Akane Haga

Track listing

References

2016 singles
Morning Musume songs
Zetima Records singles
Electronic dance music songs
Oricon Weekly number-one singles
Japanese-language songs
Songs about cats
Torch songs